Muhammad Ayub Qadri was an Urdu scholar, historian, biographer, translator and educator from Pakistan.

Muhammad Ayub Qadri was born on 28 July 1926 in Aonla, Uttar Pradesh, British India. He learned Persian from his father, Maulvi Mushitullah Qadri, and Arabic from Hakim Abdul Ghafoor, a well-known scholar and elder in his hometown. He passed the Intermediate Examination before migrating to Pakistan in 1950 in Budaun and came to Pakistan. In Pakistan, he first settled in Dadu District of Sindh and then in Karachi. He did BA from then Federal Urdu College (now University) in 1956 and joined Pakistan Historical Society as a Research Officer.

Qadri's writings include Arbab Fazl and Kamal Bareli, Maulana Faiz Ahmad Badayuni, Makhdoom Jahanian Jahan Gasht, Maulana Muhammad Ahsan Nanotvi, Jang-e-Azadi 1857 and Caravan Rafta. He also translated many important Persian books into Urdu. These include Tazkira Ulema-i-Hind, Ma'asir al-umara, Jumulah Wasaya Arba'a, Farhat-ul-Nazareen and Tabaqat-e-Akbari. He also wrote footnotes to many important and rare books. He received his PhD by writing a dissertation on the role of scholars in the evolution of Urdu prose in northern India up to 1857.

Authorship 
 Lulu Azghib (Shiv Lal) (Sequence)
 Knowledge and Action Volume I (Abdul Qadir Khani, Maulvi Moinuddin Afzal Garhi) (Translation)
 Articles World Day
 Political, cultural and scientific history of the Bangash era
 Collection of Wisaya Arba'a (translation)
 War of Independence 1857
 Calligraphy
 Sir Al-Arifin (Hamid bin Fazlullah Jamali) (translation)
 Mather Al-Amra – Volume I, II, III (by Samsam Al-Dawlah Shahnawaz Khan) (Translation)
 Tabaqat Akbari (from  Khawaja Nizamuddin Ahmed) (translation)
 Maulana Muhammad Ahsan Nanotavi
 Historical review of Tablighi Jamaat
 Marqa Shahabi
 Makhdoom Jahanian where patrol
 Maulana Faiz Ahmad Badawi
 Mention of Indian Scholars (Translation)
 The role of scholars in the evolution of Urdu prose in northern India until 1857 (PhD dissertation)
 Syed Altaf Ali Barelvi: Life and Services
 Lord of grace and perfection
 Caravan is gone
 Ghalib and Asr Ghalib

Death 
Qadri died in a traffic accident in Karachi, Pakistan on 25 November 1983 and buried in Sakhi Hassan's graveyard in Karachi.

References

Writers from Karachi
Pakistani historians
Pakistani Muslims
Pakistani bloggers
Pakistani scholars
Pakistani translators
Pakistani educational theorists
1983 deaths
1926 births
People from Bareilly district
Federal Urdu University alumni